Crocodile Society was a West African secret society that practised cannibalism.

Crocodile Society may also refer to:

 Crocodile Conservation Society in the Philippines, concerned with the Philippine crocodile
 International Crocodile Society, founded by Ross Allen (herpetologist)

See also
 Crocodile#Biology and behaviour
 Crocodile Gang, a group in Southern Rhodesia headed by Emmerson Mnangagwa
 Die Krokodile, a literary circle in Münich 1856–1879